J. Walls McCrary is an American politician and a Democratic former member of the Arkansas House of Representatives representing District 14 from January 14, 2013, to January 2015. McCrary served consecutively from January 2009 until January 2013 in the District 15 seat.

Education
McCrary attended the University of Arkansas at Fayetteville, from which he graduated in 1965 with a BSBA degree.

Elections
2012 Redistricted to District 14, with Representative Tiffany Rogers running for Arkansas Senate, McCrary was unopposed for both the May 22, 2012 Democratic Primary and the November 6, 2012 General election.
2008 Initially in District 15, when Lenville Evans ran for Arkansas Senate and left the seat open, McCrary was unopposed for the May 20, 2008 Democratic Primary and won the three-way November 4, 2008 General election with 5,736 votes (55.2%) against Republican nominee Doug Hatcher (who had run for the seat in 2002) and Independent candidate Trent Eilts.
2010 McCrary was unopposed for both the May 18, 2010 Democratic Primary and the November 2, 2010 General election.

References

External links
Official page at the Arkansas House of Representatives

Walls McCrary at Ballotpedia
Walls McCrary at the National Institute on Money in State Politics

Place of birth missing (living people)
Living people
Democratic Party members of the Arkansas House of Representatives
People from Lonoke, Arkansas
University of Arkansas alumni
1943 births